Coleophora spartana is a moth of the family Coleophoridae. It is found in Greece (Lakonia Mountain).

References
 , 2010: Contribution to the knowledge of the Coleophoridae, CXXIII. Coleophora spartana Baldizzone: A new species of the group C. lutipennella (Zeller, 1838) (Lepidoptera: Coleophoridae. Shilap Revista de Lepodopterologia 38 (150): 235-239.

spartana
Moths of Europe
Moths described in 2010